The Federal Union of European Nationalities (FUEN) is an international non-governmental organization (NGO) established in 1949 in conjunction with the formation of the Council of Europe. FUEN is an umbrella organization, as of 2023, it has more than 100 member organizations representing ethnic, linguistic and national minorities within Europe. FUEN has been instrumental in encouraging the Council of Europe to adopt the European Charter for Regional or Minority Languages and the Framework Convention for the Protection of National Minorities. FUEN was organized to give expression to European cultures and languages that do not possess form as a nation-state. One in seven Europeans are members of such minorities and fifty-three languages are spoken in Europe by such minorities.

Its predecessor was the pre-war European Congress of Nations founded by Ewald Ammende. The Congress published a journal "Nation und Staat" (1927–1944).

FUEN organises the Europeada association football tournament. In 2017-2018, FUEN collected 1,124,322 signatures from EU citizens for the Minority SafePack European Citizens' Initiative.

It is based in Flensburg, Germany, with offices in Berlin and Brussels. Its president is Lóránt Vincze, Hungarian from Romania and MEP.

See also
Minority SafePack
Unrepresented Nations and Peoples Organization
European Centre for Minority Issues
European Bureau for Lesser-Used Languages

References

External links
Official site
Language Diversity Portal

International organizations based in Europe
Stateless nationalism in Europe
Ethnic minorities
Organizations established in 1949
Non-profit organisations based in Schleswig-Holstein
Minority rights activists